Robert Daley was an American film producer and former assistant director.

Biography 
He was Clint Eastwood's producing partner from 1971 to 1980. Daley is sometimes confused with the same-named novelist who wrote Prince of the City and Year of the Dragon, among others.

He died on July 2, 2016, at his home in California.

Filmography 
He was a producer in all films unless otherwise noted.

Film 

Second unit director or assistant director

Television 

Second unit director or assistant director

References

External links 

American film producers
Living people
Year of birth missing (living people)
Place of birth missing (living people)